Opisthostoma inornatum is a species of minute land snail with an operculum, a terrestrial gastropod mollusk in the family Diplommatinidae.

This species is endemic to Malaysia.  Its natural habitat is subtropical or tropical moist lowland forests. It is threatened by habitat loss.

References

Endemic fauna of Malaysia
Invertebrates of Malaysia
Diplommatinidae
Taxonomy articles created by Polbot